Der beglückte Florindo (HWV 3) is an opera composed by Handel at the request of Reinhard Keiser, the manager of the Hamburg Opera. It was first performed (after Handel had left for Italy) at the Theater am Gänsemarkt in January 1708. It was probably directed from the harpsichord by Christoph Graupner.

The opera was the first part of a double opera, with the second part, Die verwandelte Daphne, intended to be performed on the following evening.   Keiser inserted a play in low German, called die lustige Hochzeit, into the opera, afraid that the audience would get tired otherwise. Handel was not pleased, according to Romain Rolland. Only fragments of the score survive, but a copy of the libretto exists in the Library of Congress.

The libretto was by Hinrich Hinsch, a lawyer, who also wrote the text for Keiser's first opera in Hamburg: Mahumet II (1696), based on the life of Mehmet II. Hinsch had been writing librettos since 1681. He died in 1712.

See also
 George Frideric Handel's lost Hamburg operas

References
Notes

Sources
 

Operas by George Frideric Handel
1708 operas
Operas
Opera world premieres at the Hamburg State Opera
German-language operas
Lost operas